Helmut Ruetz (born 1972) is an Austrian luger who competed during the 1990s. A natural track luger, he won two medals in the men's doubles event at the FIL World Luge Natural Track Championships with a gold in 1998 and a silver in 1996.

Ruetz also won three consecutive gold medals in the men's doubles event at the FIL European Luge Natural Track Championships (1995, 1997, 1999).

References
Natural track European Championships results 1970-2006.
Natural track World Championships results: 1979-2007

Austrian male lugers
Living people
1972 births